Birthday is a 2019 South Korean drama film directed by Lee Jong-un, starring Sol Kyung-gu and Jeon Do-yeon. The first South Korean film to explore the tragic sinking of the MV Sewol Ferry, it opened the 21st Far East Film Festival on 26 April 2019.

Plot
Ripped apart by the loss of their eldest son Su-ho (Yoon Chan-young) to the Sewol Ferry tragedy on 16 April 2014, Jung-il (Sol Kyung-gu) and Soon-nam (Jeon Do-yeon) struggle to keep their family together. No longer able to communicate with each other, they must still bring up their surviving daughter Ye-sol (Kim Bo-min).

Cast
Sol Kyung-gu as Jung-il 
Jeon Do-yeon as Soon-nam
Kim Bo-min as Ye-sol
Yoon Chan-young as Su-ho
Choi Hyeon-jin as young Su-ho
Kim Soo-jin as Woo-chan's mother
Lee Bong-ryun as Jung-sook
Park Jong-hwan as Yeong-joon
Kwon So-hyun as Eun-bin
Sung Yu-bin as Seong-joon
Bang Jae-ho as Birthday party boy
Tang Joon-sang as Woo-chan
Kim Gye-seon as Hyeong-woo's mother
Sun Wook-hyun as Hyeong-woo's father
Kim Hyun as Geon-jae's mother
Shin Mun-sung as Geon-jae's father
Kim Min-jae as Immigration officer 1 (special appearance)

Production 
Principal photography began on April 10, 2018, and wrapped on July 6, 2018.

Reception

Critical response

Accolades

References

External links

2019 films
2019 drama films
Next Entertainment World films
South Korean drama films
Films about MV Sewol
2010s South Korean films